Madison Brengle was the defending champion, having won the previous edition in 2019, but lost in the second round to Lesley Pattinama Kerkhove.

Nuria Párrizas Díaz won the title, defeating Greet Minnen in the final, 7–6(8–6), 4–6, 7–6(9–7).

Seeds

Draw

Finals

Top half

Bottom half

References

Main Draw

Koser Jewelers Tennis Challenge - Singles